Sandalwood Heights Secondary School is a Canadian high school located in the city of Brampton, Ontario and is a part of the Peel District School Board. It opened in 2007. The Specialist High Skills Major program (SHSM) features student pathways in the business sector. Specific details regarding course packages for the SHSM program are available from the counseling office at the school. School partnerships include Humber College, Ryerson University, Magna International, the Region of Peel, Apple Computers, Magnus Inc., and will provide unique cooperative education experiences for Sandalwood students.

See also
List of high schools in Ontario

References

External links
 Sandalwood Heights Secondary School

Peel District School Board
High schools in Brampton
Educational institutions established in 2007
2007 establishments in Ontario